Renkus-Heinz is a California-based manufacturer of loudspeakers and related professional sound reinforcement equipment specializing in steerable loudspeaker technology. Based in Foothill Ranch, California, the firm has a global presence in permanent installations at auditoriums, transit centers, sports venues, houses of worship and musical performance venues as well as in the concert touring industry.

History

Renkus-Heinz was founded on April 1, 1979 by Harro K. Heinz and Algis Renkus (1937–1997). Heinz had previously been awarded a patent in 1975 for his work on a "Comprehensive feedback elimination system employing notch filter" that was performed while he was employed at Rauland Borg Corporation, the company he left to found Renkus-Heinz. Algis Renkus was joined in the new enterprise by his father Jonas A. Renkus (b. 1912) who had worked at Altec under industry veteran John Kenneth Hilliard.

While at Renkus-Heinz, Jonas Renkus patented a new triple lamination construction method in 1980. In 1981, the two Renkus men left Renkus-Heinz to assist Emilar, which was having trouble staying in business. Harro Heinz remained president of Renkus-Heinz.

While Jonas and Algis Renkus were at Emilar, they began using the patented triple lamination method which had been assigned to Renkus-Heinz. Heinz sued for damages but dropped the case during the hearing.

In 1989 Harro's son Ralph D. Heinz joined Renkus-Heinz to work with Don B. Keele, Jr. and Gene Patronis and further his knowledge of electro-acoustics and horn loudspeaker design. Ralph Heinz eventually became senior vice-president of R&D and patented a method of arraying loudspeakers for better phase coherency in 1994. In 1996, he patented a multiple driver horn which was promoted as the "CoEntrant" transducer, covering both mid- and high-frequency bands in one horn. In 2016, Ralph Heinz was named Chief Technical Officer.

In 1999, Harro's daughter Monika Heinz Smetona joined Renkus-Heinz on the administrative team and was named chief operating officer in 2016. She was then named chief financial officer in 2019.

In May 2019, Matt Czyzewski joined Renkus-Heinz as president.

Awards
Rental & Staging Systems Best of Show Award for the ICLive X series
rAVe [Pubs] The Best of ISE 2019 Award for the DC12/2

See also
JBL (company)
Meyer Sound Laboratories
QSC Audio Products

References

External links

Audio amplifier manufacturers
Manufacturers of professional audio equipment
Electronics companies established in 1979
Audio equipment manufacturers of the United States
Loudspeaker manufacturers
1979 establishments in California